Hubli, officially known as Hubballi, is a city in the Indian state of Karnataka. The twin cities Hubli–Dharwad form the second largest city in the state by area and population and the largest city in North Karnataka. Hubli is in Dharwad district of Karnataka and is the taluk headquarters of Hubli City and Hubli Rural. Although it hosts the HDMC office, the district headquarters is in Dharwad.

It also houses the largest number of government offices outside the state capital. In 2016, Hubli-Dharwad was selected for solar city / green city master plans. In 2017, government of India included Hubli-Dharwad city for a smart city project, a flagship scheme for overall development of infrastructure in the twin-cities.

Etymology
The name Hubballi comes from Kannada Hoovina Balli which means "Flowering creeper" in Kannada. Hubli is the anglicised version of Hubballi.

History

Rayara Hubli, also called 'Eleya Purvada Halli' or 'Purballi', was the old Hubli, and according to an inscription in the Bhavani Shankar Temple, the oldest temple in the city, was founded in the Eleventh Century. The impressive Chandramauleshwara Temple, Unkal is from Chalukyan times and was built in the 11th or 12th century.

Under Vijayanagara Rayas, Rayara Hubli grew as a commercial centre, famous for trade in cotton, saltpetre and iron. Under the rule of the Adilshahis, the British opened a factory here. The factory was looted by Shivaji in 1673. The Mughals conquered Rayara Hubli and it was then placed under the governance of the Nawab of Savanur, who built a new extension named Majidpura. In 1727, trader Basappa Shettar built the town and fort of new Hubli around the Durgadabail (fort maidan) part of Rayara Hubli.

Hubli's famous Moorusavira Matha is claimed to have been established by a Sharana of Basaveshwara's period. Hubli was conquered by the Marathas from the Nawab of Savanur in 1755–56. In the following years, Hubli was conquered by Hyder Ali, only to be recaptured by the Marathas in 1790. At this point in time, the old town was administered by a person named Phadke under the Peshwas and the new town was under the administration of the Sangli Patwardhan. The British took Old Hubli from the Peshwas in 1817. The new town, with 47 other villages, was handed over to the British by the Sangli Patwardhan in lieu of subsidy in 1820. Later in 1880, the British started the Railway workshop and with this, Hubli came to be reckoned as an industrial centre in this part of India.

The Sufi shrine, Sayed Fathesha Wali, was visited by Tipu Sultan.

Geography

Climate 
Hubli-Dharwad has a tropical wet and dry climate. Summers are hot and dry, lasting from late February to early June. They are followed by the monsoon season, with moderate temperatures and a large amount of precipitation. Temperatures are fairly moderate from late October to early February, with virtually no rainfall. Hubli is 640 meters above sea level. The average yearly rainfall is 838 mm.

Tourist Attractions 

 Siddharoodha Swami Math
 Kitttur Rani Chennamma Circle
 Unkal Lake
 Nrupatunga Hills
 Indira Gandhi Glass House
 Chandramouleshwar Temple
 Railway Heritage Museum
 ISCKON Shri Krishna Balarama Temple
 St Joseph Church
 Navagraha Teertha Jain Mandir
 Sayed Fateh Shah Dargah
 Banashankari Temple 
 Cotton County Water World
 Gayatri Tapovan Bhoomi

Hubli-Dharwad Municipal Corporation 

Hubli-Dharwad Municipal Corporation (HDMC) was constituted in 1962 by combining the two cities separated by a distance of 20 kilometres.  The area covered by the corporation is spread over 45 revenue villages and is the second-largest city corporation in Karnataka state.  The population of the city as per the 1991 census was 700,000. The population of Hubli-Dharwad is 943,857 according to 2011 Census. Hubli Municipal Council was established under the Government of India Act of 1850, and the Dharwad Municipal Council first came into existence on 1 January 1856. Both were merged later. The headquarters of HDMC is situated in Hubli, comprising 82 members covering four Vidhan Sabha Constituencies of Hubli-Dharwad. There has been a huge demand by people of Dharwad to create a separate civic body and get itself detached by HDMC. Claims are that most of the funds are allocated to Hubli solely.

Economy

Hubli is the commercial hub of Karnataka state popularly known as Vanijya Nagari & Chota Mumbai. Hubli has a wide cluster of industries and has more than a lakh small and medium industries. The Government of India has set up a Software Technology Park of India on Dharwad Road and Aryabhata Tech Park in Navanagar region of Hubli. The city is situated on the dividing line between Malnad and the Deccan plateau. Malnad is well known for its forests and forest-based industries and the other three sides are known for their agricultural products including cotton, groundnut, and oilseeds, as well as manganese ore and granite.

The establishment of a new-generation diesel locomotive shed in the city by Indian Railways was another major boost for the development of industries in this region, as it was the first of its kind in Indian Railways history. The diesel locomotive shed at Hubli is the largest holder of EMD locomotives in India and was set up in 1880.

Demographics

The population of the twin cities as per provisional figures of Census 2011 is 943,857 and is urban. Hubli-Dharwad's population increased by 22.99% between 1981 and 1991, from 527,108 to 648,298, and by 21.2% between 1991 and 2001. The municipality covers 213 km2.

Education 

Hubli, is an education centre in Karnataka, housing several educational institutions:
 KLE Technological University, set up in 1947
 Karnataka Institute of Medical Sciences, Hubli, set up in 1957; also houses one of the largest hospitals in India
 Karnataka State Law University, Hubli; all the law colleges in Karnataka are regulated from here
 KLE Institute of Technology, set up in 2008
 Nehru Arts, Science and Commerce College

Transport

Air 

Hubli Airport  is a domestic airport serving the twin cities of Hubli-Dharwad and North Karnataka in the state of Karnataka, India. It is the third busiest airport in Karnataka and the 45th busiest airport in India. In March 2020, Hubli airport received the best airport award under government of India's Regional connectivity scheme. Hubli airport connects to 10 destinations throughout the country. Efforts are being made to make Hubli Airport as international Airport.

Rail 

The city currently has four stations and one Junction. The Hubli Junction railway station is the main railway station in the city with a built-up area of 161,460 sq. ft. In September 2020, the union cabinet has approved the change of the station name to 'Shree Siddharoodha Swamiji Railway Station - Hubballi'. The other stations are Hubli South, Hubli East, Unkal, and Amargol.  Hubli is the headquarters of the South Western Railway zone. It was carved out as a zone from the current South Central Railway. It is the centre for the Hubli Division. The Hubli Division is one of the highest revenue-generating divisions in India. Hubli is well-connected by the Indian Rail Network. Several trains ply from Hubli to Mumbai, New Delhi, Hyderabad, Chennai, Varanasi Vijaywada, Rameshwaram & other cities In November 2019, the work for extending a platform was undertaken by the Railways at the estimated cost of 90 Cr. According to railway  officials, the length of the renewed platform is estimated at 1,505 meters, which would be longest in the world. The work is scheduled to be completed by the end of 2020. Hubballi also has a Heritage Rail museum. The Indian Railways currently has 11 railway museums across the country. For bringing glory to the proposed Rail Museum, narrow-gauge Railway Rolling Stocks, from different Railways are being displayed and work is moving at a rapid pace. It is proposed to collect photographs of Rail network going back to the 19th and early 20th century so that all old memories of Rail Journey can be part of the photo gallery in the proposed Rail Heritage Museum.

Road 
Hubli lies on the "Golden Quadrilateral". Asian Highway 47 passes through Hubli. It lies on National Highway 63 (Ankola–Gooty) and National Highway 218 (Hubli–Humnabad), which connect Hubli with major cities in the region. NWKRTC (North West Karnataka Road Transport Corporation) is a state-run corporation headquartered at Hubli. A semi ring road connecting NH4 (Mumbai-Chennai), NH67 (Ankola–Gooty) and NH218 (Hubli–Humnabad) with cloverleaf Junction at Gabbur is already under construction.

Hubli-Dharwad Bus Rapid Transit System 

Hubballi-Dharwad BRTS (also known as HDBRTS) is a bus rapid transit system built to serve the twin cities of Hubli and Dharwad, located in the North-Western part of Karnataka state in India. Hubli-Dharwad BRTS (HDBRTS) project is a Government of Karnataka initiative to foster long-term economic growth in the region. The project promotes fast, safe, comfortable, convenient and affordable public transportation between the twin cities and aims to reduce congestion and air pollution in the region.

The BRTS corridor includes segregated bus lanes, access-controlled bus stations, physical and fare integration with BRT feeder services, off-board ticketing through smart cards and bar-coded paper tickets, intelligent transport system and high-quality buses (Standard AC buses). The corridor is designed for operating regular and express services. It consists of two lanes for BRTS buses on either side of the median bus station facilitating overtaking lanes for express services. Foot overbridges at six locations, PELICAN signals, and synchronised signal management are proposed to facilitate the easy approach of passengers to bus stations.

Notable people 
 

 Gururaj Deshpande, co-founder of Sycamore Networks, the Deshpande Center for Technological Innovation at MIT and the Deshpande Foundation
 Gangubai Hangal, Hindustani classical vocalist and Padma Vibhushan awardee
 Siddappa Kambli, politician who played an important role in the Karnataka Ekikarna Movement
 Rao Sahib Ganpatrao Narayanrao Madiman, businessman and banker
 Sudha Murty, Infosys co-founder & wife of  Narayan Murthy
 Akshata Murty, British-based fashion designer
 Vijay Sankeshwar, owner of VRL Group logistic company

See also
 Kendriya Vidyalaya No. 1, Hubli
Dharwad

References

External links

 Hubli - Dharwad Municipal Corporation
 

Articles containing potentially dated statements from 2001
All articles containing potentially dated statements
 
Cities in Karnataka